Cameron Percy (born 5 May 1974) is an Australian professional golfer.

Percy was born in Chelsea, Victoria and turned professional in 1998. He joined the second-tier Nationwide Tour (now known as the Korn Ferry Tour) in 2005, but enjoyed little success and returned to Australia where he won twice on the developmental Von Nida Tour in 2006.

Percy was back on the Nationwide Tour in 2008 and the following year finished in 8th place on the money list, having had eight top 10 finishes including two runner-up finishes, to graduate to the PGA Tour for 2010. 

Percy has since bounced back-and-forth between the PGA Tour and the Korn Terry Tour. He finished 168th on the FedEx Cup points list in 2010, 161st in 2011, and 158th in 2013. In 2014, he prevailed in a five-way playoff to win the Price Cutter Charity Championship on the Web.com Tour. He finished 15th on the final 2014 Web.com Tour money list to secure his PGA Tour card for the 2014–15 season. 

Over the next six seasons (2014–15 through 2020–21 seasons), he finished outside of the top 125 on the FedEx Cup points list every year, and thus was not able to regain his card. However, he finished inside the top 150 in four of those six seasons, and thus maintained conditional status on the PGA Tour during most of that time.

Professional wins (6)

Web.com Tour wins (1)

Web.com Tour playoff record (0–1)

Von Nida Tour wins (3)

Other wins (2)
1996 Tasmanian Open
1997 Tasmanian Open

Playoff record
PGA Tour playoff record (0–1)

Results in major championships

CUT = missed the half-way cut
Note: Percy only played in The Open Championship.

Results in The Players Championship

"T" indicates a tie for a place

Team appearances
Amateur
Nomura Cup (representing Australia): 1997
Australian Men's Interstate Teams Matches (representing Victoria): 1996, 1997

See also
2009 Nationwide Tour graduates
2012 Web.com Tour graduates
2014 Web.com Tour Finals graduates
2016 Web.com Tour Finals graduates
2019 Korn Ferry Tour Finals graduates

References

External links

Australian male golfers
PGA Tour golfers
PGA Tour of Australasia golfers
Korn Ferry Tour graduates
Golfers from Melbourne
People from Chelsea, Victoria
Sportsmen from Victoria (Australia)
1974 births
Living people